Warren J. Warwick was an American pediatrician, notable for co-inventing a chest wall oscillation device called the Vest Airway Clearance System, or "The Vest", a mechanical vest for clearing the lungs of children with cystic fibrosis. He was Professor of Pediatric Pulmonology at the University of Minnesota and director from 1962 to 1999 of the Cystic Fibrosis Center at the University of Minnesota, recognized by peer institutions as the best in the United States.

References

External links
 Department of Pediatrics, page on Warren Warwick
 New Yorker article featuring Warwick, Annals of Medicine. The Bell Curve. What happens when patients find out how good their doctors really are?, by Atul Gawande December 6, 2004. 
 Tribute to Dr. Warwick by the President and CEO of the Cystic Fibrosis Foundation

Year of birth missing
2016 deaths
American pediatricians
University of Minnesota faculty
Cystic fibrosis
American pulmonologists